The discography of Passion Pit, an American indietronica band, has released four studio albums, three extended plays and fourteen singles.

Studio albums

Extended plays

Singles

As lead artist

As featured artist

Remixes

Other appearances

Notes

References

External links

Discographies of American artists